Elsa Cárdenas Rentería (born 3 August 1932) is a Mexican actress. Since 1954 she has appeared in more than 100 films and television shows. She starred in the film Happiness, which was entered into the 7th Berlin International Film Festival. She acted alongside many stars, including Elvis Presley in Fun in Acapulco and James Dean in Giant. She claimed to have had a love affair with Elvis Presley during the filming of Fun in Acapulco (1963). She later married Guy Patton. She is a star from classic films from the Golden Age of Mexican cinema and from Classical Hollywood cinema.

Selected filmography

 Giant (1956)
 The Brave One (1956)
 Happiness (1957)
 Have Gun-Will Travel (1959) as “Lahri”
 Fun in Acapulco (1963)
 Of Love and Desire (1963)
 Casa de Mujeres (1966)
 La señora Muerte (1969)
 The Wild Bunch (1969)
 La Pachanga (1981)

Telenovelas
 Mar de amor (2009) – Luciana de Irazabal

References

External links

 

1932 births
20th-century Mexican actresses
Living people
Mexican film actresses
Mexican television actresses
Actresses from Baja California
People from Tijuana